The 1929 Maine Black Bears football team was an American football team that represented the University of Maine as a member of the New England Conference during the 1929 college football season. In its ninth season under head coach Fred Brice, the team compiled a 2–5 record (1–2 against conference opponents). The team played its home games at Alumni Field in Orono, Maine. Lavon Zakarian was the team captain.

Schedule

References

Maine
Maine Black Bears football seasons
Maine Black Bears football